Muruk (also Romanized as Mūrūk; also known as Marūk, Merūk, Morūk, Mowrak, and Mūrak) is a village in Vardasht Rural District, in the Central District of Semirom County, Isfahan Province, Iran. At the 2006 census, its population was 414, in 97 families.

References 

Populated places in Semirom County